The Glasgow Courier is a weekly newspaper in Glasgow, Montana, USA, published on Wednesdays. It began in 1913 as ’s rebranding of the Valley County Independent, which itself succeeded The Montana Homestead, established in neighboring Hinsdale, Montana in 1904.

References

Newspapers published in Montana
Newspapers established in 1913
Glasgow, Montana